The 1894 Shōnai earthquake is an earthquake occurred on October 22, 1894 at Sakata, Yamagata Prefecture in Japan. It was caused by the movement of the Shonai Plain Eastern Margin Fault Zone (庄内平野東縁断層帯).

Damage 
According to the official confirmed report, 14,118 houses and buildings were damaged and 2,148 were burned. There were 726 fatalities and 8,403 injuries in the damaged area. A large-scale fire broke out in Sakata, and around the Shonai plain area, many instances of cracked earth, sinking ground, sand boils, and fountains were observed.

References 

1894 earthquakes
October 1894 events
1894 in Japan
Earthquakes of the Meiji period
1894 disasters in Japan